Geethanjali is a 1989 Indian Telugu-language romantic drama film written and directed by Mani Ratnam. It stars Nagarjuna and Girija who appears as the titular character in her film debut. The music is composed by Ilaiyaraaja. Upon release, the film was a commercial success, running for over 100 days in theatres. The film won National Film Award for Best Popular Film Providing Wholesome Entertainment and also won six Nandi Awards. The film was later remade in Hindi as Yaad Rakhegi Duniya (1992).

Plot 
Prakash, a carefree, mischievous student graduates from College. During his celebration with his friends, he gets into a road accident. Although the accident is only minor, during medical tests, he is diagnosed with terminal cancer and has a few months to live. Unable to hear his mother's constant wailing, he packs his bags and leaves to his family's vacation home in Ooty.

There, he meets Geetanjali, who enjoys playing pranks on people around her. In one incident, Geetanjali asks a guy to meet her near a church after sundown to elope with her. When he comes to meet her, she along with her sisters and friends play an elaborate prank by dressing up as ghosts to scare him away. When she tries to pull the same prank on Prakash, who is already aware of this, it backfires as he pulls a bigger prank on her by dressing himself as a vampire and along with aerial wire stunts, scares her.

After being unsuccessful in scaring Prakash away, Geethanjali forms another plan in which she complains to her grandmother that Prakash had asked her (Geethanjali) to elope with him. Furious at this knowledge, Geethanjali's grandmother confronts Prakash about it. Though Prakash tries his best to explain the truth, Geethanjali's grandmother chides him and humiliates him in public. Prakash becomes angry and retaliates by driving Geethanjali to a hillside area and leaving her there. Later that night, Geethanjali's youngest sister comes to Prakash and tells him that Geethanjali has still not returned home and they are getting worried about her. Prakash goes out to look for her and upon finding her shivering in the cold, brings her back to her family. Geethanjali's grandmother scolds Prakash for pulling such a stunt on Geethanjali as such things could have worsened her health condition. Curious at this, Prakash inquires about her health. To his dismay, he finds out that she has a terminal illness. This intrigues him as she is always happy and energetic. Geethanjali tells him that she's not worried about her impending death as everyone who lives in this world will be gone someday. She also tells him that she's not bothered about what happens in the future and she only lives for today. This teaches Prakash to take his own impending death in stride and live life to the fullest.

Prakash begins to fall in love with Geethanjali and pursues her. Thinking that this is also a part of his mischief, Geethanjali keeps putting him off. But one thing leads to another and soon, she too reciprocates his love. One day, Prakash's mother comes to visit him and finds out about her son's love. Not knowing that Prakash has been keeping his illness a secret from Geethanjali, his mother blurts out the truth to Geethanjali. She becomes heart-broken knowing that Prakash's condition is worse than her own. She confronts Prakash and tells him to leave her. Prakash reminds Geethanjali that everyone dies one day and so will he. He tells her that his death is no exception. But a devastated Geethanjali admits that his own life is more important to her than her own and she would not be able to see his death. She begs him to leave her and tells him that she doesn't want to see him again. That night, Geethanjali's health worsens and she is admitted in the hospital. After getting the news, Prakash rushes to the hospital to meet her, but Geethanjali's father, who happens to be a doctor, requests him to leave since Geethanjali wishes the same. Prakash becomes sad and decides to leave the town. At the same time, Geethanjali undergoes an operation for her heart. Hours after her operation, Geethanjali slowly opens her eyes. Her whole family rejoices at her recovery. Geethanjali looks at her father and tells him that she wants to meet Prakash. The family finds out that he is planning to leave the town and rush to the railway station. Prakash sees Geethanjali and turns back to run to her and hold her hand which she outstretches. The movie ends as Geethanjali and Prakash reunite and kiss.

Cast 
 Nagarjuna as Prakash
 Girija as Geethanjali
 Vijayakumar as Geethanjali's father
 Vijayachander as Prakash's father
 Radhabai as Geethanjali's grandmother
 Sumithra as Prakash's mother
 Mucherla Aruna as Prakash's doctor
 Dubbing Janaki as Lakshmi
 Baby Neena
 Sowcar Janaki as Chancellor
 Suthi Velu as the Ooty house caretaker

Special appearances (listed alphabetically)
 Chandramohan
 Disco Shanti in Ragada Ragada
 Silk Smitha in item number

Production 
Fascinated by the script and box office performance of Mani Ratnam's Mouna Ragam (1986), Nagarjuna was keen on featuring in a film directed by him. Nagarjuna revealed that he used to wait outside Ratnam's house every morning when the director would go on his daily walk to exchange conversation. After a month of regularly attempting to run into the director, Nagarjuna requested him to direct a Telugu film with him in the lead, which the director agreed to after initial reluctance. The film was Geethanjali, which remains the only Telugu film directed by Ratnam. Girija was cast as the lead actress after the director Maniratnam saw her at the wedding of the sister of  Krishnamachary Srikanth, former Indian Cricket Team and Suhasini. Girija's voice was dubbed by Rohini during post-production. 

Principal photography began on 12 October 1988 and was completed in sixty days. Most of the scenes were shot in Ooty and a few shots were filmed in Madras. Ratnam shot the film in the misty valleys of Ooty to give it a soft, poetic atmosphere. Filming would start early in the dawn, around 5 AM, and wrap up by about 11 AM, in order to capture the scenes in a dreamy atmosphere; the cast and crew had to arrive on location one hour before filming. In addition, an ice machine was brought from Madras to provide any additional mist if the shot didn't look romantic enough.

Soundtrack 
The music was composed by Ilaiyaraaja, with lyrics by Veturi. The first song finalised was "O Papa Lali!".

Release 
Geethanjali was released on 19 May 1989. Praveen Kumar Reddy had to distribute the film himself in select places like Visakhapatnam as distributors were sceptical; despite this, it was a commercial success, running for over 100 days in theatres. The Tamil-dubbed version Idhayathai Thirudathe was released on 5 July 1989 and was also successful.

Accolades

Legacy 
Nagarjuna became the heart-throb of Telugu filmgoers with Geethanjali. An immense following of girls and ladies began for Nagarjuna. Geethanjali was released five months prior to another trend-setter, Siva starring Nagarjuna. These two films helped Nagarjuna gain both class and mass audience and were the stepping stones for many more blockbusters later in his career. Ratnam also gained a huge following in Andhra Pradesh with this film. The film was unofficially remade in Hindi as Yaad Rakhegi Duniya (1992).

References

Sources

External links 

1989 films
1989 romantic drama films
Best Popular Film Providing Wholesome Entertainment National Film Award winners
Films directed by Mani Ratnam
Films scored by Ilaiyaraaja
Films shot in Ooty
Films shot in Rajasthan
Indian romantic drama films
Telugu films remade in other languages